Appleton High School is the name of several high schools in Appleton, Wisconsin:

 Appleton East High School (est. 1967)
 Appleton North High School (est. 1995)
 Appleton West High School (est. 1915)